Ipaoides is a monotypic genus of East Asian dwarf spiders containing the single species, Ipaoides saaristoi. It was first described by A. V. Tanasevitch in 2008, and has only been found in China.

See also
 List of Linyphiidae species (I–P)

References

Linyphiidae
Monotypic Araneomorphae genera
Spiders of China